Maximilian Schulze Niehues (born 11 November 1988) is a German professional footballer who plays for SC Preußen Münster, as a goalkeeper.

External links
 
 

1988 births
Living people
People from Warendorf
Sportspeople from Münster (region)
German footballers
Footballers from North Rhine-Westphalia
Association football goalkeepers
Fortuna Düsseldorf players
SC Preußen Münster players
3. Liga players